Martín Horacio Herrera (born 13 September 1970) is an Argentine former professional footballer who played as a goalkeeper.

Club career

Boca Juniors
Born in Río Cuarto, Córdoba, Herrera started his senior career with Argentine giants Boca Juniors in 1991 after signing from his local club Estudiantes de Río Cuarto. During his tenure, he played understudy to the likes of Carlos Navarro Montoya; on 16 May 1993, in a reserve game against Club Atlético Independiente, a clash with an opponent resulted in head trauma, a depressed cheekbone, orbital fracture and torn ligaments, which sidelined him for nine months.

Journeyman
Subsequently, Herrera joined Club Atlético Atlanta of the Primera B Metropolitana. He then had brief spells with Deportivo Toluca FC (Mexico) and Ferro Carril Oeste, leaving the latter after not being paid for several months.

Alavés
On 8 July 1999, Herrera moved to the Spanish La Liga after signing a three-year contract with Deportivo Alavés for 200 million pesetas. He was an undisputed starter in his first year, being awarded the Ricardo Zamora Trophy with only 37 goals conceded (all 38 matches played), which was good enough to qualify to the UEFA Cup after the sixth-place finish.

Herrera continued to be first choice for the Basques in the following season, but was also briefly suspended by the Royal Spanish Football Federation for allegedly holding a false Italian passport. He later succeeded in proving his origins, and helped his team reach the final of the UEFA Cup on 16 May 2001, a 5–4 extra time loss against Liverpool after an own golden goal.

Fulham
In May 2002, Herrera agreed to a three-year deal at Fulham. A backup to Edwin van der Sar and Maik Taylor, he only made his Premier League debut on 24 February 2003 in a 1–1 away draw to Tottenham Hotspur as a substitute, after Taylor was sent off.

Herrera's second and final competitive appearance took place on 16 March 2003, when he started in the 2–2 draw against Southampton at Craven Cottage.

Estudiantes LP
Herrera returned to his country and its Primera División on 17 July 2003, being loaned to Estudiantes de La Plata. Initially a starter, he lost his spot to Mariano Andújar after being sent off in a 0–2 loss at Boca Juniors in September 2006, never being selected again by manager Diego Simeone before terminating his contract the following month; nonetheless, he was part of the squad that won that year's Apertura championship, defeating the same opposition in the championship playoff.

Estudiantes RC
After one year out of football, the 37-year-old Herrera returned to activity with his first club Estudiantes Río Cuarto. He retired in 2009.

Honours
Toluca
Liga MX: 1998 Torneo Verano

Estudiantes La Plata
Argentine Primera División: 2006 Apertura

Individual
Ricardo Zamora Trophy: 1999–2000

References

External links
Argentine League statistics 

1970 births
Living people
People from Río Cuarto, Córdoba
Sportspeople from Córdoba Province, Argentina
Argentine footballers
Association football goalkeepers
Argentine Primera División players
Estudiantes de Río Cuarto footballers
Boca Juniors footballers
Club Atlético Atlanta footballers
Ferro Carril Oeste footballers
Estudiantes de La Plata footballers
Liga MX players
Deportivo Toluca F.C. players
La Liga players
Deportivo Alavés players
Premier League players
Fulham F.C. players
Argentine expatriate footballers
Expatriate footballers in Mexico
Expatriate footballers in Spain
Expatriate footballers in England
Argentine expatriate sportspeople in Mexico
Argentine expatriate sportspeople in Spain
Argentine expatriate sportspeople in England